Germany competed at the 1996 Summer Olympics in Atlanta, United States. 465 competitors, 278 men and 187 women, took part in 234 events in 26 sports.

Medalists

Gold
 Lars Riedel — Athletics, Men's Discus Throw
 Astrid Kumbernuss — Athletics, Women's Shot Put 
 Ilke Wyludda — Athletics, Women's Discus Throw 
 Kay Bluhm and Torsten Gutsche — Canoeing, Men's K2 500 m Kayak Pairs 
 Detlef Hofmann, Thomas Reineck, Olaf Winter and Mark Zabel — Canoeing, Men's K4 1000 m Kayak Fours 
 Andreas Dittmer and Gunar Kirchbach — Canoeing, Men's C2 1000 m Canadian Pairs 
 Oliver Fix — Canoeing, Men's K1 Kayak Slalom Singles 
 Birgit Fischer, Manuela Mucke, Anett Schuck and Ramona Portwich — Canoeing, Women's K4 500 m Kayak Fours 
 Jens Fiedler — Cycling, Men's 1000 m Sprint (Scratch)
 Ulrich Kirchhoff — Equestrian, Jumping Individual 
 Ludger Beerbaum, Ulrich Kirchhoff, Lars Nieberg, and Franke Sloothaak — Equestrian, Jumping Team
 Isabell Werth — Equestrian, Dressage Individual 
 Klaus Balkenhol, Martin Schaudt, Monica Theodorescu, and Isabell Werth — Equestrian, Dressage Team 
 Andreas Wecker — Gymnastics, Men's Horizontal Bar 
 Udo Quellmalz — Judo, Men's Half Lightweight (65 kg) 
 Andreas Hajek, André Steiner, Stephan Volkert, and André Willms — Rowing, Men's Quadruple Sculls 
 Kathrin Boron, Kerstin Köppen, Katrin Rutschow, and Jana Sorgers — Rowing, Women's Quadruple Sculls 
 Thomas Flach, Bernd Jäkel, and Jochen Schümann — Sailing, Men's Soling Team Competition
 Ralf Schumann — Shooting, Men's Rapid-Fire Pistol 
 Christian Klees — Shooting, Men's Small-bore Rifle, prone

Silver
 Barbara Mensing, Sandra Wagner, and Cornelia Pfohl — Archery, Women's Team Competition 
 Frank Busemann — Athletics, Men's Decathlon 
 Oktay Urkal — Boxing, Men's Light Welterweight (63,5 kg)
 Kay Bluhm and Torsten Gutsche — Canoeing, Men's K2 1000 m Kayak Pairs 
 Birgit Fischer and Ramona Portwich — Canoeing, Women's K2 500 m Kayak Pairs 
 Jan Hempel — Diving, Men's Platform 
 Annika Walter — Diving, Women's Platform 
 Roland Baar, Wolfram Huhn, Detlef Kirchhoff, Mark Kleinschmidt, Frank Richter, Thorsten Streppelhoff, Peter Thiede, Ulrich Viefers, and Marc Weber — Rowing, Men's Eights 
 Petra Horneber — Shooting, Women's Air Rifle 
 Susanne Kiermayer — Shooting, Women's Double Trap 
 Sandra Völker — Swimming, Women's 100 m Freestyle 
 Franziska van Almsick — Swimming, Women's 200 m Freestyle 
 Dagmar Hase — Swimming, Women's 400 m Freestyle 
 Dagmar Hase — Swimming, Women's 800 m Freestyle 
 Dagmar Hase, Kerstin Kielgass, Franziska van Almsick, Sandra Völker, Meike Freitag (heats), and Simone Osygus (heats)  — Swimming, Women's 4 × 200 m Freestyle Relay 
 Marc Huster — Weightlifting, Men's Light Heavyweight (83 kg) 
 Ronny Weller — Weightlifting, Men's Super Heavyweight (> 108 kg) 
 Thomas Zander — Wrestling, Men's Greco-Roman Middleweight (82 kg)

Bronze
 Florian Schwarthoff — Athletics, Men's 110 m Hurdles 
 Andrej Tiwontschik — Athletics, Men's Pole Vault 
 Grit Breuer, Linda Kisabaka, Uta Rohländer, and Anja Rücker — Athletics, Women's 4 × 400 m Relay 
 Zoltan Lunka — Boxing, Men's Flyweight (51 kg)
 Thomas Ulrich — Boxing, Men's Light Heavyweight (81 kg)
 Luan Krasniqi — Boxing, Men's Heavyweight (91 kg)
 Thomas Becker — Canoeing, Men's K1 Kayak Slalom Singles 
 André Ehrenberg and Michael Senft — Canoeing, Men's C2 Canadian Slalom Pairs 
 Judith Arndt — Cycling, Women's Individual Pursuit 
 Sabine Bau, Anja Fichtel-Mauritz, and Monika Weber — Fencing, Women's Foil Team Competition
 Richard Trautmann — Judo, Men's Extra Lightweight (60 kg)
 Marko Spittka — Judo, Men's Middleweight (86 kg)
 Frank Möller — Judo, Men's Heavyweight 
 Johanna Hagn — Judo, Women's Heavyweight 
 Thomas Lange — Rowing, Men's Single Sculls 
 Mark Warnecke — Swimming, Men's 100 m Breaststroke 
 Mark Pinger, Christian Tröger, Bengt Zikarsky, Björn Zikarsky, and Alexander Lüderitz (heats) — Swimming, Men's 4 × 100 m Freestyle Relay 
 Aimo Heilmann, Christian Keller, Christian Tröger, Steffen Zesner, Konstantin Dubrovin (heats), and Oliver Lampe (heats) — Swimming, Men's 4 × 200 m Freestyle Relay 
 Dagmar Hase — Swimming, Women's 200m Freestyle
 Sandra Völker — Swimming, Women's 50 m Freestyle 
 Cathleen Rund — Swimming, Women's 200 m Backstroke 
 Antje Buschschulte, Simone Osygus, Franziska van Almsick, Sandra Völker, and Meike Freitag (heats) — Swimming, Women's 4 × 100 m Freestyle Relay 
 Jörg Roßkopf — Table Tennis, Men's Singles 
 Marc-Kevin Goellner and David Prinosil — Tennis, Men's Doubles 
 Oliver Caruso — Weightlifting, Men's Middle Heavyweight (91 kg) 
 Maik Bullmann — Wrestling, Men's Greco-Roman Light Heavyweight (90 kg) 
 Arawat Sabejew — Wrestling, Men's Freestyle Heavyweight (100 kg)

Archery

In Germany's sixth archery competition, the German women's team won the silver medal.  Germany's highest placing individual was Barbara Mensing, who advanced to the quarterfinal before being defeated.  No Germany men competed in Atlanta.

Women's Individual Competition:
 Barbara Mensing → Quarterfinal, 8th place (3-1)
 Sandra Wagner → Round of 64, 34th place (0-1)
 Cornelia Pfohl → Round of 64, 40th place (0-1)

Women's Team Competition:
 Mensing, Wagner, and Pfohl →  Final,  Silver Medal (3-1)

Athletics

Men's 100 metres
 Marc Blume

Men's 800 metres
 Nico Motchebon
 Joachim Dehmel

Men's 1,500 metres 
 Michael Gottschalk
 Qualification — 3:56.46 (→ did not advance)

 Rüdiger Stenzel

Men's 5,000 metres 
 Dieter Baumann
 Qualification — 13:52.00
 Semifinal — 14:03.75
 Final — 13:08.81 (→ 4th place)

 Stephane Franke
 Qualification — 14:06.34
 Semifinal — 13:40.94
 Final — 13:44.64 (→ 14th place)

Men's 10,000 metres
 Stephane Franke

Men's 3,000 metres Steeplechase
Steffen Brand
 Heat — 8:31.18 
 Semifinals — 8:19.11 
 Final — 8:18.52 (→ 6th place)

Martin Strege
 Heat — 8:32.76 
 Semifinals — 8:27.99
 Final — 8:30.31 (→ 10th place)

 Kim Bauermeister
 Heat — 8:36.86
 Semifinals — 8:51.83 (→ did not advance)

Men's 110m Hurdles
 Florian Schwarthoff
 Claude Edorh
 Eric Kaiser

Men's 4 × 100 m Relay
 Marc Blume, Holger Blume, Michael Huke, Robert Kurnicki, and Andreas Ruth

Men's 4 × 400 m Relay
 Rico Lieder, Andreas Hein, Kai Karsten, and Thomas Schönlebe
 Heat — 3:05.16 (→ did not advance)
 Alternate member: Uwe Jahn

Men's Marathon
 Konrad Dobler — 2:21.12 (→ 48th place)
 Stephan Freigang — did not finish (→ no ranking)

Men's 20 km Walk
 Robert Ihly
 Nischan Daimer
 Andreas Erm

Men's 50 km Walk
Axel Noack — 3:51:55 (→ 12th place)
 Thomas Wallstab — 3:54:48 (→ 15th place)
 Ronald Weigel — did not finish (→ no ranking)

Men's Long Jump
 Georg Ackermann
 Qualification — 7.86m (→ did not advance)

 Hans-Peter Lott
 Qualification — NM (→ did not advance)

Men's High Jump
 Wolfgang Kreißig

Men's triple jump
 Charles Friedeck

Men's Pole Vault
 Tim Lobinger
 Michael Stolle
 André Tiwontschik

Men's Shot Put
 Oliver-Sven Buder
 Dirk Urban
 Michael Mertens

Men's Decathlon 
 Frank Busemann 
 Final Result — 8706 points (→  Silver Medal)

 Frank Müller 
 Final Result — 8253 points (→ 14th place)

 Dirk-Achim Pajonk 
 Final Result — 8045 points (→ 20th place)

Men's Discus Throw 
 Lars Riedel
 Qualification — 64.66m
 Final — 69.40m (→  Gold Medal)

 Jürgen Schult
 Qualification — 62.58m
 Final — 64.62m (→ 6th place)

 Michael Möllenbeck
 Qualification — 55.18m (→ did not advance)

Men's Hammer Throw 
 Heinz Weis
 Qualification — 77.84m
 Final — 79.78m (→ 5th place)

 Claus Dethloff
 Qualification — 74.60m (→ did not advance)

 Karsten Kobs
 Qualification — 74.20m (→ did not advance)

Men's Javelin Throw
 Raymond Hecht
 Peter Blank
 Boris Henry

Women's 100 metres
 Melanie Paschke
 Andrea Philipp
 Silke Lichtenhagen

Women's 200 metres
 Melanie Paschke
 Silke Knoll

Women's 400 metres
 Grit Breuer

Women's 800 metres
 Linda Kisabaka

Women's 1,500 metres
 Silvia Kühnemund
 Carmen Wüstenhagen

Women's 5,000 metres
 Petra Wassiluk
 Claudia Lokar

Women's 10,000 metres
 Kathrin Weßel
 Qualification — 33:31.67 (→ did not advance)

Women's Marathon
 Katrin Dörre-Heinig — 2:28.45 (→ 4th place)
 Sonja Krolik — 2:31.16 (→ 8th place)
 Uta Pippig — did not finish (→ no ranking)

Women's 10 km Walk
 Kathrin Born-Boyde — 44:50 (→ 15th place)
 Beate Gummelt — dsq (→ no ranking)

Women's 100m Hurdles
 Kristin Patzwahl
 Birgit Wolf

Women's 400m Hurdles
 Heike Meißner
 Qualification — 55.05
 Semifinals — 54.27
 Final — 54.03 (→ 5th place)

 Silvia Rieger
 Qualification — 55.33
 Semifinals — 54.27
 Final — 54.57 (→ 8th place)

Women's 4 × 100 m Relay
 Melanie Paschke, Andrea Philipp, Silke Lichtenhagen, Silke Knoll, and Birgit Rockmeier

Women's 4 × 400 m Relay
 Uta Rohländer, Linda Kisabaka, Anja Rücker, and Grit Breuer 
 Qualification — 3:24.08
 Final — 3:21.14 (→  Bronze Medal)
Alternate member: Karin Janke

Women's Javelin Throw
 Karen Forkel
 Qualification — 60.84m
 Final — 64.18m (→ 6th place)

 Steffi Nerius
 Qualification — 60.98m
 Final — 60.20m (→ 9th place)

 Silke Renk
 Qualification — 59.70m (→ did not advance)

Women's High Jump
 Alina Astafei
 Qualification — 1.93m
 Final — 1.96m (→ 6th place)

Women's Discus Throw 
 Ilke Wyludda
 Qualification — 66.78m
 Final — 69.66m  (→  Gold Medal)

 Franka Dietzsch
 Qualification — 63.94m
 Final — 65.48m (→ 4th place)

 Anja Gündler
 Qualification — 63.80m
 Final — 61.16m (→ 11th place)

Women's Shot Put
 Astrid Kumbernuss
 Qualification — 19.93m
 Final — 20.56m (→  Gold Medal)

 Stephanie Storp
 Qualification — 19.29m
 Final — 19.06m (→ 6th place)

 Kathrin Neimke
 Qualification — 19.02m
 Final — 18.92m (→ 7th place)

Women's Heptathlon
 Sabine Braun
 Mona Steigauf
 Peggy Beer

Badminton

Men's Competition
 Michael Keck
 Michael Helber
 Oliver Pongratz

Women's Competition
 Katrin Schmidt
 Kerstin Ubben
 Karen Stechmann

Beach volleyball

Men's Competition
 Jörg Ahmann and Axel Hager — 9th place overall

Women's Competition
 Beate Bühler and Danja Müsch

Boxing

 Zoltan Lunka (— 51 kg)
Defeated Martín Castillo (Mexico) 13-7
Defeated Hermensen Ballo (Indonesia) 18-12
Defeated Mehdi Assous (Algeria) 19-6
Lost to Bulat Jumadilov (Kazakhstan) 18-23
 Falk Huste (— 57 kg)
 Oktay Urkal (— 63,5 kg)
Defeated Reynaldo Galido (Philippines) 19-2
Defeated David Díaz (United States) 14-6
Defeated Nordine Mouichi (France) 19-10
Defeated Fathi Missaoui (Tunisia) 20-6
Lost to Hector Vinent (Cuba) 13-20
 Markus Beyer (— 71 kg)
 Sven Ottke (— 75 kg)
 Thomas Ulrich (— 81 kg)
 Luan Krasniqi (— 91 kg)
 René Monse (+ 91 kg)

Canoeing

Men's Flatwater Competition
 Lutz Liwoski, Kay Bluhm, Andreas Dittmer, Torsten Gutsche, Detlef Hofmann, Gunar Kirchbach, Thomas Reineck, Jan Schäfer, Patrick Schulze, Olaf Winter, Mark Zabel, and Thomas Zereske

Women's Flatwater Competition
 Birgit Fischer, Daniela Gleue, Manuela Mucke, Ramona Portwich, Anett Schuck,

Men's Slalom Competition
 Jochen Lettmann, Oliver Fix, Thomas Becker, Sören Kaufmann, Martin Lang, and Vitus Husek
 Manfred Berro / Michael Trummer 
 André Ehrenberg / Michael Senft

Women's Slalom Competition
 Elisabeth Micheler-Jones, and Kordula Striepecke

Cycling

Road Competition
Men's Individual Time Trial
Michael Rich 
 Final — 1:07:08 (→ 10th place)

Uwe Peschel
 Final — 1:07:33 (→ 12th place)

Women's Individual Road Race
Vera Hohlfeld 
 Final — 02:37:06 (→ 4th place)

Track Competition
Men's Points Race
 Guido Fulst
 Final — 8 points (→ 9th place)

Mountain Bike
Men's Cross Country
 Ralph Berner
 Final — 2:27:45 (→ 10th place)

Women's Cross Country
 Regina Marunde
 Final — 1:57.21 (→ 7th place)

Diving

Men's 3m Springboard
Jan Hempel
 Preliminary Heat — 358.26
 Semi Final — 219.99
 Final — 402.33 (→ 7th place)

Andreas Wels
 Preliminary Heat — 405.33
 Semi Final — 207.21
 Final — 376.35 (→ 12th place)

Women's 3m Springboard
Claudia Bockner
 Preliminary Heat — 281.31
 Semi Final — 200.19
 Final — 255.51 (→ 11th place)

Simona Koch
 Preliminary Heat — 239.91
 Semi Final — 204.99 (→ did not advance, 16th place)

Women's 10m Platform
Annika Walter
 Preliminary Heat — 298.11 
 Semi Final — 166.14  
 Final — 313.08 (→  Silver Medal)

Ute Wetzig
 Preliminary Heat — 258.93 
 Semi Final — 151.44 
 Final — 215.91 (→ 12th place)

Equestrian

Dressage
 Isabell Werth ("Gigolo")
 Monica Teodorescu ("Grunox")
 Martin Schaudt ("Durgo 2")
 Klaus Balkenhol ("Goldstern")
 Nicole Uphoff-Becker ("Rembrandt")

Jumping
 Ludger Beerbaum ("Ratina Z" and "Gaylord")
 Ulrich Kirchhof ("Jus de Pommes")
 Franke Sloothaak ("Joly" and "Weihaiweij")
 Lars Nieberg ("For Pleasure")

Eventing
 Bodo Battenberg ("Sam the Man")
 Ralf Ehrenbrink ("Connection L" and "West Star")
 Wolfgang Mengers ("Flaming Affair")
 Bettina Overesch-Böker ("Watermill Stream")
 Hendrik von Paepcke ("Amadeus")
 Peter Thomsen ("White Girl")

Fencing

15 fencers, 9 men and 6 women, represented Germany in 1996.

Men's foil
 Wolfgang Wienand
 Uwe Römer
 Alexander Koch

Men's team foil
 Alexander Koch, Uwe Römer, Wolfgang Wienand

Men's épée
 Marius Strzalka
 Arnd Schmitt
 Elmar Borrmann

Men's team épée
 Elmar Borrmann, Arnd Schmitt, Marius Strzalka

Men's sabre
 Felix Becker
 Steffen Wiesinger
 Frank Bleckmann

Men's team sabre
 Felix Becker, Frank Bleckmann, Steffen Wiesinger

Women's foil
 Monika Weber-Koszto
 Anja Fichtel-Mauritz
 Sabine Bau

Women's team foil
 Anja Fichtel-Mauritz, Monika Weber-Koszto, Sabine Bau

Women's épée
 Eva-Maria Ittner
 Claudia Bokel
 Katja Nass

Women's team épée
 Claudia Bokel, Eva-Maria Ittner, Katja Nass

Football

Women's Team Competition
Team roster
 Manuela Goller (Grün-Weiß Brauweiler)
 Katja Kraus (FSV Frankfurt)
 Jutta Nardenbach (TuS Ahrbach)
 Birgitt Austermühl (FSV Frankfurt)
 Doris Fitschen (TSV Siegen)
 Sandra Minnert (FSV Frankfurt)
 Kerstin Stegemann (FC Eintracht Rheine)
 Dagmar Pohlmann (FSV Frankfurt)
 Martina Voss (FC Rumeln-Kaldenhausen)
 Bettina Wiegmann (Grün-Weiß Brauweiler)
 Silvia Neid (TSV Siegen)
 Pia Wunderlich (SG Praunheim)
 Renate Lingor (SC Klinge Seckach)
 Heidi Mohr (TuS Niederkirchen)
 Patricia Brocker (TuS Niederkirchen)
 Birgit Prinz (FSV Frankfurt)
Head coach: Gero Bisanz

Gymnastics

Artistic Gymnastics
Men's Competition
 Uwe Billerbeck, Valeri Belenki, Oliver Walther, Karsten Oelsch, Marius Toba, Jan-Peter Nikiferov, and Andreas Wecker

Women's Competition
 Kathleen Stark and Yvonne Pioch

Handball

Men's team competition
Markus Baur
Jan Fegter
Henning Fritz
Jan Holpert
Holger Löhr
Thomas Knorr
Karsten Kohlhaas
Stephan Kretschmar
Klaus-Dieter Petersen
Christian Scheffler
Martin Schmidt
Martin Schwalb
Christian Schwarzer
Daniel Stephan
Andreas Thiel
Volker Zerbe

Women's Team Competition
Kathrin Blacha
Andrea Bölk
Eike Bram
Csilla Elekes
Michaela Erler
Franziska Heinz
Grit Jurack
Eva Kiss-Györi
Christine Lindemann
Emilia Luca
Heike Murrweiss
Miroslava Ritskiavitchius
Michaela Schanze
Melanie Schliecker
Bianca Urbanke
Marlies Waelzer

Hockey

Men's team competition
Preliminary round (group A)
 Germany — Spain 0—1
 Germany — India 1—1
 Germany — Pakistan 3—1
 Germany — Argentina 3—0
 Germany — United States 3—0
Semi Finals
 Germany — Netherlands 1—3
Bronze Medal Game
 Germany — Australia 2—3 → Fourth place

Team roster
Christopher Reitz (gk)
Jan-Peter Tewes
Carsten Fischer
Christian Blunck
Björn Emmerling
Patrick Bellenbaum
Sven Meinhardt
Christoph Bechmann
Oliver Domke
Andreas Becker
Michael Green
Klaus Michler
Volker Fried
Christian Mayerhöfer
Stefan Saliger
Michael Knauth (gk)
Head coach: Paul Lissek

Women's Team Competition
Preliminary Round Robin
 Germany — Argentina 2—0
 Germany — Spain 2—1
 Germany — Australia 0—1
 Germany — Netherlands 3—4
 Germany — United States 1—1
 Germany — Great Britain 2—3
 Germany — South Korea 0—1 → Sixth place

Team roster
(01.) Susie Wollschläger (gk)
(02.) Birgit Beyer (gk)
(03.) Vanessa van Kooperen
(04.) Philippa Suxdorf
(05.) Nadine Ernsting-Krienke
(06.) Simone Thomaschinski
(07.) Irina Kuhnt
(08.) Melanie Cremer
(09.) Franziska Hentschel
(10.) Tanja Dickenscheid
(11.) Eva Hagenbäumer
(12.) Britta Becker
(13.) Natascha Keller
(14.) Tina Peters
(15.) Heike Lätzsch
(16.) Katrin Kauschke

Men's Competition
Richard Trautmann (— 60 kg)
Udo Quellmalz (— 65 kg)
Martin Schmidt (— 71 kg)
Stefan Dott (— 78 kg)
Marko Spittka (— 86 kg)
Detlef Knorrek (— 95 kg)
Frank Möller (+ 95 kg)

Women's Competition
Jana Perlberg (— 48 kg)
Alexa von Schwichow (— 52 kg)
Susanne Singer (— 61 kg)
Anja von Rekowski (— 66 kg)
Hannah Ertel (— 72 kg)
Johanna Hagn (+ 72 kg)

Rhythmic gymnastics

 Nicole Bittner, Dörte Schiltz, Katharina Wildermuth, Anne Jung, Luise Stäblein, and Katrin Hoffmann

Rowing

Men's competition
 Thomas Lange (Single sculls →  Bronze medal)
 Sebastian Mayer / Roland Opfer (Double sculls)
 Colin von Ettingshausen / Matthias Ungemach (Coxless pair)
 André Steiner, Andreas Hajek, Stephan Volkert, and André Willms (Quadruple sculls →  Gold medal)
 Ike Landvoigt, Stefan Forster, Claas-Peter Fischer, and Stefan Scholz (Coxless four) 
 Wolfram Huhn, Marc Weber, Detlef Kirchhoff, Mark Kleinschmidt, Thorsten Streppelhoff, Ulrich Viefers, Frank Richter, Roland Baar and Peter Thiede (coxswain) (Eight →  Silver medal)
 Peter Uhrig / Ingo Euler (Lightweight double sculls) 
 Tobias Rose, Martin Weis, Michael Buchheit, and Bernhard Stomporowski (Lightweight coxless four)

Women's competition
 Meike Evers (Single sculls)
 Jana Thieme / Manuela Lutze (Double sculls)
 Kathrin Haacker / Stefani Werremeier (Coxless pair)
 Kathrin Boron, Jana Sorgers, Katrin Rutschow, and Kerstin Köppen (Quadruple sculls →  Gold medal)
 Anja Pyritz, Antje Rehaag, Andrea Gesch, Ina Justh, Kathlen Naser, Dana Pyritz, Michaela Schmidt, Ute Schell and Daniela Neunast (coxswain) (Eight)
 Michelle Darvill / Ruth Kaps (Lightweight double sculls)

Sailing

Men's Competition
Michael Fellmann (Finn-Dinghi)
Frank Butzmann / Kai Falkenthal (Star)
Jochen Schümann / Bernd Jäkel / Thomas Flach (Soling →  Gold Medal)
Ronald Rensch / Torsten Haverland (470er) 
Stefan Warkalla (Laser)
Matthias Bornhäuser (Mistral)
Roland Gäbler / Frank Parlow (Tornado)

Women's Competition
 Sibylle Powarzynski (Europe)
 Susanne Bauckholt / Katrin Adlkofer (470er)

Shooting

Rifle
 Maik Eckhard, Christian Klees, Bernd Rücker, Johann Riederer, Petra Horneber, Bettina Knells, and Kirsten Obel

Pistol
 Ralf Schumann, Hans-Jürgen Neumaier, Daniel Leonhardt, Artur Gevorgian, and Anke Völker

Running Target
 Michael Jakosits and Jens Zimmermann

Trap and Skeet
 Uwe Möller, Jörg Damme, Bernhard Hochwald, Jan-Henrik Heinrich, Axel Wegner, Waldemar Schanz, Karsten Bindrich, and Susanne Kirchmayer

Swimming

Men's Competition
Men's 50 m Freestyle
 Bengt Zikarsky
 Heat — 22.68
 Swim-off — DSQ
 B-Final — 22.73 (→ 10th place)

 Alexander Lüderitz
 Heat — 23.06 (→ did not advance, 21st place)

Men's 100 m Freestyle
 Christian Tröger
 Heat — 50.06
 B-Final — 49.90 (→ 10th place)

 Björn Zikarsky
 Heat — 50.38
 B-Final — 49.91 (→ 11th place)

Men's 200 m Freestyle
 Aimo Heilmann
 Heat — 1:49.57
 B-Final — 1:48.81 (→ 9th place)

Men's 400 m Freestyle
 Jörg Hoffmann
 Heat — 3:51.26
 Final — 3:52.15 (→ 7th place)

 Sebastian Wiese
 Heat — 3:53.65
 B-Final — 3:52.37 (→ 10th place)

Men's 1500 m Freestyle
 Jörg Hoffmann
 Heat — 15:18.61
 Final — 15:18.86 (→ 7th place)

 Steffen Zesner
 Heat — 15:21.65 (→ did not advance, 9th place)

Men's 100 m Backstroke
 Ralf Braun
 Heat — 55.73
 Final — 55.56 (→ 7th place)

 Stev Theloke
 Heat — 56.26
 B-Final — 56.63 (→ 14th place)

Men's 200 m Backstroke
 Ralf Braun
 Heat — 2:01.50
 B-Final — scratched

Men's 100 m Breaststroke
 Mark Warnecke
 Heat — 1:01.79
 Final — 1:01.33 (→  Bronze Medal)

Men's 100 m Butterfly
 Oliver Lampe
 Heat — 54.56 (→ did not advance, 22nd place)

Men's 200 m Butterfly
 Oliver Lampe
 Heat — 1:59.87
 B-Final — 2:00.08 (→ 12th place)

 Chris-Carol Bremer
 Heat — 2:00.48
 B-Final — 2:01.62 (→ 16th place)

Men's 200 m Individual Medley
 Christian Keller
 Heat — 2:03.82
 B-Final — 2:02.90 (→ 9th place)

 Stev Theloke
 Heat — 2:04.23
 B-Final — 2:03.94 (→ 12th place)

Men's 4 × 100 m Freestyle Relay
 Mark Pinger, Alexander Lüderitz, Bengt Zikarsky, and Björn Zikarsky
 Heat — 3:19.27
 Christian Tröger, Bengt Zikarsky, Björn Zikarsky, and Mark Pinger
 Final — 3:17.20 (→  Bronze Medal)

Men's 4 × 200 m Freestyle Relay
 Konstantin Dubrovin, Christian Keller, Oliver Lampe, and Steffen Zesner
 Heat — 7:22.17
 Aimo Heilmann, Christian Keller, Christian Tröger, and Steffen Zesner
 Final — 7:17.71 (→  Bronze Medal)

Men's 4 × 100 m Medley Relay
 Stev Theloke, Mark Warnecke, Oliver Lampe, and Bengt Zikarsky
 Heat — 3:41.30
 Ralf Braun, Mark Warnecke, Christian Keller, and Björn Zikarsky
 Final — 3:39.64 (→ 4th place)

Women's Competition
Women's 50 m Freestyle
 Sandra Völker
 Heat — 25.45
 Final — 25.14 (→  Bronze Medal)

 Simone Osygus
 Heat — 26.00
 B-Final — 26.16 (→ 14th place)

Women's 100 m Freestyle
 Sandra Völker
 Heat — 55.55
 Final — 54.88 (→  Silver Medal)

 Franziska van Almsick
 Heat — 55.80
 Final — 55.59 (→ 5th place)

Women's 200 m Freestyle
 Franziska van Almsick
 Heat — 1:59.40
 Final — 1:58.57 (→  Silver Medal)

 Dagmar Hase
 Heat — 2:00.38
 Final — 1:59.56 (→  Bronze Medal)

Women's 400 m Freestyle
 Dagmar Hase
 Heat — 4:11.17 
 Final — 4:08.30 (→  Silver Medal)

 Kerstin Kielgass
 Heat — 4:08.99
 Final — 4:09.83 (→ 4th place)

Women's 800 m Freestyle
 Dagmar Hase
 Heat — 8:33.55 
 Final — 8:29.91 (→  Silver Medal)

 Kerstin Kielgass
 Heat — 8:36.33
 Final — 8:31.06 (→ 4th place)

Women's 100 m Backstroke
 Antje Buschschulte
 Heat — 1:02.68
 Final — 1:02.52 (→ 6th place)

 Anke Scholz
 Heat — 1:03.05
 B-Final — 1:02.85 (→ 10th place)

Women's 200 m Backstroke
 Cathleen Rund
 Heat — 2:13.58
 Final — 2:12.06 (→  Bronze Medal)

 Anke Scholz
 Heat — 2:12.73
 B-Final — 2:12.90 (→ 4th place)

Women's 100 m Breaststroke
 Kathrin Dumitru
 Heat — 1:11.92 (→ did not advance, 26th place)

Women's 200 m Breaststroke
 Kathrin Dumitru
 Heat — 2:37.07 (→ did not advance, 29th place)

Women's 100 m Butterfly
 Julia Voitowitsch
 Heat — 1:01.47
 B-Final — 1:01.14 (→ 12th place)

Women's 200 m Butterfly
 Sabine Herbst
 Heat — 2:16.66 (→ did not advance, 19th place)

Women's 200 m Individual Medley
 Sabine Herbst
 Heat — 2:18.00
 B-Final — 2:16.68 (→ 11th place)

Women's 400 m Individual Medley
 Sabine Herbst
 Heat — 4:45.36
 Final — 4:43.78 (→ 4th place)

 Cathleen Rund
 Heat — 4:55.30 (→ did not advance, 21st place)

Women's 4 × 100 m Freestyle Relay
Simone Osygus, Antje Buschschulte, Meike Freitag, and Franziska van Almsick
 Heat — 3:44.17
Sandra Völker, Simone Osygus, Antje Buschschulte, and Franziska van Almsick
 Final — 3:41.48 (→  Bronze Medal)

Women's 4 × 200 m Freestyle Relay
Simone Osygus, Meike Freitag, Anke Scholz, and Franziska van Almsick
 Heat — 8:08.58
Franziska van Almsick, Kerstin Kielgass, Anke Scholz, and Dagmar Hase
 Final — 8:01.55 (→  Silver Medal)

Women's 4 × 100 m Medley Relay
Antje Buschschulte, Kathrin Dumitru, Franziska van Almsick, and Sandra Völker
 Heat — 4:08.95
Antje Buschschulte, Kathrin Dumitru, Franziska van Almsick, and Sandra Völker
 Final — 4:09.22 (→ 6th place)

Table tennis

Men's Competition
 Jörg Roßkopf
 Steffen Fetzner
 Peter Franz

Women's Competition
 Jie Schöpp
 Nicole Struse
 Olga Nemes
 Elke Schall

Tennis

Men's Singles Competition
 Marc-Kevin Goellner
 First Round — Lost to Thomas Enqvist (SWE), 6-7 6-4 4-6

Men's Doubles Competition
 David Prinosil and Marc-Kevin Goellner

Women's Singles Competition
 Anke Huber
 First Round — Defeated Cătălina Cristea (ROM), 2-6 6-4 6-2
 Second Round — Defeated Mariaan de Swardt (RSA), 3-6 6-1 6-4
 Third Round — Lost to Lindsay Davenport (USA), 1-6 6-3, 3-6

Volleyball

Team roster
Nancy Celis
Tanja Hart
Karin Horninger
Silvia Roll
Susanne Lahme
Grit Naumann
Hanka Pachale
Ines Pianka
Constanze Radfan
Christine Schultz
Ute Steppin
Claudia Wilke
Head coach: Sigfried Kohler

Water polo

Men's team competition
Ingo Borgmann
Piotr Bukowski
Oliver Dahler
Jörg Dresel
Torsten Dresel
Davor Erjavec
Michael Ilgner
Dirk Klingenberg
Raul de la Peña
René Reimann
Uwe Sterzik
Lars Tomanek
Daniel Voß

Weightlifting

 Andreas Behm (Lightweight)
 Ingo Steinhöfel and Andrey Poitschke (Middleweight)

Men's Light-Heavyweight (— 83 kg)
Marc Huster
 Final — 170.0 + 212.5 = 382.5 (→  Silver Medal)

 Oliver Caruso (Middle-heavyweight) 
 Igor Sadykov (Heavyweight)
 Manfred Nerlinger and Ronny Weller (Super-heavyweight)

Men's Heavyweight (108 kg)
Mario Kalinke  
Snatch — 177.5 kg
Clean & Jerk — 212.5 kg
Total — 390.0 kg (→ 9th place)

Dimitri Prochorov  
Snatch — 175.0 kg
Clean & Jerk — 215.0 kg
Total — 390.0 kg (→ 11th place)

Wrestling

Greco-Roman
 Oleg Kutscherenko (— 48 kg)
 Alfred Ter-Mkrtchyan (— 52 kg)
 Rifat Yildiz (— 57 kg)
 Erik Hahn (— 74 kg)
 Thomas Zander (— 82 kg)
 Mike Bullmann (— 90 kg)
 Rene Schiekel (— 130 kg)

Freestyle
 Jürgen Scheibe (— 62 kg)
 Alexander Leipold (— 74 kg)
 Heiko Balz (— 90 kg)
 Aravat Sabejev (— 100 kg)
 Sven Thiele (— 130 kg)

Notes

References

Nations at the 1996 Summer Olympics
1996
Summer Olympics